"Keep On Running" is the first episode of the BBC sitcom The Green Green Grass. It was first screened on 9 September 2005.

Synopsis
Boycie begins a normal day of neglecting his wife, ignoring his son and taking the dog for a walk in a taxi but all is to change. Upon the arrival of friend Denzil, Boycie soon finds out that the Driscoll Brothers, who are currently in prison, are due to be released in three weeks time. Worse still, they have been tipped off that Boycie was the supergrass whose evidence got them imprisoned. Fearing for his life, Boycie sells the house and showroom and buys Winterdown Farm in Oakham, Shropshire.

Upon arriving in Shropshire, Boycie, Marlene and Tyler get lost and cannot find Winterdown Farm. They stop off at a local pub only to find the tradition of Morris dancing still exists in the country. They soon find the farm and begin to settle in until a knock at the door frightens them. It turns out to be Elgin Sparrowhawk, the farm's very own manager. After several disturbing revelations during their conversation with him they decide to retire only... what did happen in that bedroom?

Cast

Production

Writing
This episode was written by John Sullivan, writer of Only Fools and Horses. The whole of the first series was written entirely by John Sullivan.

Conception
The idea for The Green Green Grass came from John Challis' real-life situation. John Sullivan, writer of Only Fools and Horses saw how John's life had changed since he and his wife Carol had moved some ten years ago. He decided after watching the episode Little Problems of Only Fools and Horses, where Boycie is obviously terrified of the Driscoll Brothers, to have him shop them to the police and flee before their release. The prequel idea, Once Upon a Time in Peckham was put on hold until the project got onto its feet.

Continuity
 This episode carries on from the final Only Fools and Horses episode, "Sleepless in Peckham".
 The characters of Boycie and Marlene still live in their mock-Georgian house on Kings Avenue until their forced move.
 The character of Denzil, an Only Fools and Horses regular makes a guest appearance.
 References to Del Boy are made infrequently.
 Boycie makes a reference to the showroom, a location only ever seen in Only Fools and Horses.

Filming
Filming for the first series of The Green Green Grass started in June 2005. The series was ready for broadcast by the end of August 2005. Only Fools and Horses regular, Paul Barber was involved in the first episode in a small guest appearance and was the only original cast member to make an appearance. However, Roy Heather has made a cameo as Sid and Roy Marsden and Christopher Ryan have made three appearances as the Driscoll Brothers. With Roy Heather's appearance, the set of The Nag's Head was used.

Broadcast and reception
During its original airing, the episode had a viewing audience of 8.88 million, in the 8:30pm timeslot it was shown. It is the highest viewing figure the show has received to date.

This episode has since been re-run on BBC1, BBC HD and GOLD. The show received one of the highest ratings of the week making it into the top ten.

The final scene of the episode, under the end credits, features an obvious dubbing where an expletive used by Marlene in the studio recording is replaced with a different word suitable for the pre-watershed airing.

DVD release
The UK DVD release was released on 23 October 2006. The release includes the 2005 Christmas Special, a short special entitled 'Grass Roots' and a short documentary on 'Rocky'.

Notes
 This is one of four episodes in which characters from Only Fools and Horses make an appearance. The other episodes are One Flew Over the Cuckoo Clock 2005, Brothers and Sisters 2006 and Home Brew 2009.

References

External links
British TV Comedy Guide for The Green Green Grass
BARB viewing figures
The Green Green Grass at BBC Comedy
The Green Green Grass website
British Sitcom Guide for The Green Green Grass
The Green Green Grass at Only Fools and Horses website

2005 British television episodes
The Green Green Grass episodes